The following are lists of affiliates of the Fox Broadcasting Company (Fox) television network:

List of Fox television affiliates (by U.S. state)
List of Fox television affiliates (table)
List of former Fox television affiliates

See also
Lists of ABC television affiliates
Lists of CBS television affiliates
Lists of NBC television affiliates